The 2013 Limerick Senior Hurling Championship was the 119th staging of the Limerick Senior Hurling Championship since its establishment in 1887. The championship began on 2013 and is ended on 6 October 2013.

Kilmallock were the defending champions, however, they were defeated in the semi-final stage. Na Piarsaigh won the title following a 0-14 to 0-12 defeat of Adare in the final.

Results

Group 1

Group 2

Group 3

Group 4

Quarter-finals

Semi-finals

Final

References

Limerick Senior Hurling Championship
Limerick Senior Hurling Championship